Dimethyl phosphorochloridothioate is a chemical compound used as an intermediate for insecticides, pesticides, and fungicides, as well as additives for oil and gasoline, plasticizers corrosion inhibitors; flame retardants and flotation agents. It is an irritant for skin, eyes, and mucous membranes.

References

Organophosphorohalidates